The  was the main battleship fleet of the Imperial Japanese Navy.

History
First established on 28 December 1903, the IJN 1st Fleet was created during the Russo-Japanese War when the Imperial General Headquarters divided the Readiness Fleet into a mobile strike force of cruisers and destroyers to pursue the Imperial Russian Navy's Vladivostok-based cruiser squadron (the Imperial Japanese Navys 2nd Fleet), while the remaining bulk of the Japanese fleet (the IJN 1st Fleet) continued to blockade Port Arthur in hopes of luring the battleships of the Russian Pacific Fleet out into a classic line-of-battle confrontation.  The two fleets were combined into the Combined Fleet for the final Battle of Tsushima.
The decisive victory of the Japanese fleet over the Imperial Russian Navy at the Battle of Tsushima validated the doctrine of the "decisive victory", or kantai kessen as stipulated by naval theorists such as Alfred Thayer Mahan and Satō Tetsutarō in the eyes of the Imperial Japanese Navy General Staff, and future naval procurement and deployment was centered on refinements of this doctrine. The Mahanian objective was to build a fleet in being, a naval force kept deliberately in strategic reserve, as secondary forces based on cruisers and destroyers waged a campaign of attrition against an approaching enemy, who would then be destroyed in a climactic final battle similar to the Battle of Tsushima.
As a result of this doctrine, although individual ships and task forces were dispatched on occasion for specific combat operations, the main force in the Imperial Japanese Navy was mostly held in reserve from the time of its inception until near the end of World War II.

Commanders of the IJN 1st Fleet

Chief of Staff

References

Books

External links

1
Military units and formations established in 1903
Military units and formations disestablished in 1944